Wolfgang Schober (born 6 July 1989) is an Austrian football goalkeeper currently playing for FC Wacker Innsbruck.

External links
Guardian Football Stats

1989 births
Living people
Austrian footballers
SV Ried players
FC Wacker Innsbruck (2002) players

Association football goalkeepers
Footballers from Munich
FC Red Bull Salzburg players
TSV Hartberg players
German footballers
FC Bayern Munich footballers